Pettis County is a county located in west central U.S. state of Missouri. As of the 2010 census, the population was 42,201. Its county seat is Sedalia. The county was organized January 24, 1833, and named after former U.S. Representative Spencer Darwin Pettis.

Pettis County comprises the Sedalia, MO Micropolitan Statistical Area.

The county is home to the site of the Missouri State Fair in Sedalia.

Geography 
It is drained by Lamine River and branches.

Adjacent counties 
 Saline County (north)
 Cooper County (east)
 Morgan County (southeast)
 Benton County (south)
 Henry County (southwest)
 Johnson County (west)
 Lafayette County (northwest)

Major highways 
  U.S. Route 50
  U.S. Route 65
  Route 52
  Route 127
  Route 135

Demographics 

As of the census of 2000, there were 39,403 people, 15,568 households, and 10,570 families residing in the county.  The population density was 58 people per square mile (22/km2).  There were 16,963 housing units at an average density of 25 per square mile (10/km2).  The racial makeup of the county was 92.06% White, 3.04% Black or African American, 0.38% Native American, 0.39% Asian, 0.05% Pacific Islander, 2.46% from other races, and 1.62% from two or more races. Approximately 3.88% of the population were Hispanic or Latino of any race.

There were 15,568 households, out of which 32.50% had children under the age of 18 living with them, 53.30% were married couples living together, 10.50% had a female householder with no husband present, and 32.10% were non-families. 27.00% of all households were made up of individuals, and 11.70% had someone living alone who was 65 years of age or older.  The average household size was 2.49 and the average family size was 3.01.

In the county, the population was spread out, with 26.30% under the age of 18, 9.30% from 18 to 24, 27.90% from 25 to 44, 21.10% from 45 to 64, and 15.40% who were 65 years of age or older.  The median age was 36 years. For every 100 females there were 94.40 males.  For every 100 females age 18 and over, there were 91.70 males.

The median income for a household in the county was $31,822, and the median income for a family was $38,073. Males had a median income of $29,221 versus $19,554 for females. The per capita income for the county was $16,251.  About 10.20% of families and 12.80% of the population were below the poverty line, including 16.60% of those under age 18 and 10.50% of those age 65 or over.

2020 Census

Education

Public schools 
 Green Ridge R-VIII School District – Green Ridge
 Green Ridge Elementary School (K-06)
 Green Ridge High School (07-12)
 La Monte R-IV School District – La Monte
 La Monte Elementary School (PK-06)
 La Monte High School (07-12)
 Pettis County R-V School District – Hughesville
 Northwest Elementary School (K-06)
 Northwest High School (07-12)
 Pettis County R-XII School District – Sedalia
 Pettis County Elementary School (PK-08)
 Sedalia School District No. 200 – Sedalia
 Sedalia Early Childhood Education Center (PK)
 Heber Hunt Elementary School (K-04)
 Skyline Elementary School (K-04)
 Parkview Elementary School (K-04)
 Horace Mann Elementary School (K-04)
 Washington Elementary School (K-04)
 Sedalia Middle School (05)
 Smith-Cotton Junior High School (06-08)
 Smith-Cotton High School (9-12)
 Smithton R-VI School District – Smithton
 Smithton Elementary School (PK-06)
 Smithton High School (07-12)

Private schools 
 St. Paul’s Lutheran School – Sedalia (PK-08) – Lutheran
 Sedalia Seventh-day Adventist School – Sedalia (01-08) – Seventh-day Adventist
 Show-Me Christian School – La Monte (K-12) – Nondenominational Christian
 Applewood Christian School – Sedalia (K-12) – Nondenominational Christian
 Sacred Heart Schools – Sedalia (K-12) – Roman Catholic
 Sacred Heart Elementary School (K-06)
 Sacred Heart High School (07-12)

Post-secondary 
 State Fair Community College – Sedalia – A public, two-year/community college.

Public libraries 
 Boonslick Regional Library
 Sedalia Public Library

Politics

Local 
The Republican Party predominantly controls politics at the local level in Pettis County. Republicans hold all but three of the elected positions in the county.

State 

Pettis County is divided into four legislative districts in the Missouri House of Representatives, all of which are held by Republicans.
 District 48 — Dave Muntzel (R-Boonville).  Consists of the community of Smithton and the northeast section of the county.

 District 51 — Dean Dohrman (R-La Monte). Consists of the communities of Houstonia, Hughesville, and La Monte and the northwest portion of the county.

 District 52 — Nathan Beard (R-Sedalia). Consists of the community of Sedalia.

 District 54 — Dan Houx (R-Warrensburg). Consists of the community of Green Ridge and the southern portion of the county.

All of Pettis County is a part of Missouri's 28th District in the Missouri Senate and was previously represented by Mike Parson but the seat is currently vacant.

Federal 

All of Pettis County is included in Missouri's 4th Congressional District and is currently represented by Vicky Hartzler (R-Harrisonville) in the U.S. House of Representatives.

Political culture

Communities

Cities and Towns

 Green Ridge
 Houstonia
 Hughesville
 Ionia
 La Monte
 Sedalia (county seat)
 Smithton
 Windsor

Unincorporated Communities

 Bahner
 Beaman
 Bryson
 Dresden
 Dunksburg
 Georgetown
 Longwood
 Manila
 Newland
 Postal
 Spring Fork
 Stokley
 Tedieville

See also 
 National Register of Historic Places listings in Pettis County, Missouri

References

External links 
 Digitized 1930 Plat Book of Pettis County  from University of Missouri Division of Special Collections, Archives, and Rare Books

 
1833 establishments in Missouri
Populated places established in 1833